Ülemiste Keskus (Estonian: Ülemiste keskus) is a shopping centre in Tallinn, Estonia. It's adjacent to Tallinn Airport in Ülemiste. It has over 220 stores, 8 restaurants, and a large playroom for children.

The center is managed by Ülemiste Center OÜ, which earned 12 million euros in rental income in 2015 and whose net profit in the same year was 11.5 million euros. The owner of the company is Ülemiste Holding Nederland B.V., which in turn belongs to Linstow AS registered in Norway.

See also
Ülemiste City
Lake Ülemiste
Ülemiste Tunnel

References

External links
Ülemiste Keskus

Economy of Tallinn
Buildings and structures in Tallinn
Retail companies of Estonia
Shopping centres in Estonia
Tourist attractions in Tallinn